Ayer y Hoy (English Yesterday and today) is the 10th studio album by Mexican pop singer Ana Gabriel. It was released on 1994. This material was produced by herself. She praises several idols of ranchera music with this material like Agustín Lara, José A. Jiménez, Juan Gabriel, Armando Manzanero and Cuco Sánchez. Ayer y Hoy was nominated for a Lo Nuestro Award for Regional Mexican Album of the Year at the 7th Lo Nuestro Awards.

Track listing
Tracks:
 Mírales, Escúchales - 03:22
 Que Manera De Perder - 03:28
 Dos Locos De Amor - 03:05
 Como Agua Para Chocolate - 04:09
 Tú Lo Decidiste - 03:49
 Último Adiós - 03:30
 Parece Que Fue Ayer - 03:10
 Vámonos - 02:59
 No Tengo Dinero - 03:14
 De Aquí Para Allá - 03:45
 Silverio Pérez - 02:37
 México Lindo & Querido/Cielito Lindo - 05:25

Singles
 Tú Lo Decidiste
 Como Agua Para Chocolate
 No Tengo Dinero

Singles charts

Album chart
This release reached the #2 position in Regional Mexican Albums staying for 26 weeks  and it reached the #6 position in the Billboard Top Latin Albums staying for 35 weeks in the chart.

Sales and certifications

References

1994 albums
Ana Gabriel albums